Omphisa is a genus of moths of the family Crambidae described by Frederic Moore in 1886.

Species
Omphisa anastomosalis (Guenée, 1854)
Omphisa caustalis Hampson, 1913
Omphisa fuscidentalis (Hampson, 1896)
Omphisa illisalis (Walker, 1859)
Omphisa leucostolalis Hampson, 1918
Omphisa repetitalis Snellen, 1890
Omphisa robusta Janse, 1928
Omphisa vaovao Viette, 1973
Omphisa variegata Kenrick, 1912

Former species
Omphisa ingens Hampson, 1899

References

Spilomelinae
Crambidae genera
Taxa named by Frederic Moore